In Search of Sunrise is the first compilation album in the In Search of Sunrise series mixed by Dutch trance producer and DJ Tiësto, released on 22 November 1999 in the Netherlands (see 1999 in music).

Track listing

External links

Tiësto compilation albums
1999 compilation albums